Karin Elisabeth Svantesson (née Lundin; born 26 October 1967) is a Swedish politician of the Moderate Party. She has served as Minister for Finance in the cabinet of Ulf Kristersson since October 2022 and has served as first deputy leader of the party since 2019. 

Svantesson previously served as Minister for Employment from 2013 to 2014. She has been a Member of the Riksdag since 2006, representing Örebro County.

Career 
Svantesson studied economics at Örebro University between 1987–1991. Prior to being elected to the Swedish Riksdag, she was a university teacher and doctoral student. She holds an economics licentiate from 2006.

Svantesson was elected to the Swedish Riksdag in the 2006 general election. In the Riksdag, she became an ordinary member of the Labour Market Committee and a deputy member of the Enterprise Committee. In October 2009 she also became deputy member of the Finance Committee and in November 2009 she became an ordinary member of the board of the Swedish National Audit Office. She retained her seat in the 2010 general election and from 2010 she was an ordinary member of the Finance Committee until 2012 when she became chairman of the Labour Market Committee.

On 17 September 2013, she was appointed Minister for Employment by Prime Minister Fredrik Reinfeldt.

Following defeat in 2014, she returned to the Riksdag where she became deputy chair of the Committee on Social Insurance. On 11 December 2014, Svantesson was appointed spokesperson for employment policies of the Moderate Party and deputy chair of the Committee on Employment. On 17 December 2014, she was nominated to become second deputy leader of the Moderate Party and she was elected to the position on 10 January 2015.

In October 2019, Svantesson was elected first deputy leader of the Moderate Party.

Minister of Finance (2022-present)
Since 18 October 2022, she is the Minister of Finance in the Ulf Kristersson Cabinet.

Personal life 

Svantesson is married, has three sons, and lives in Örebro, Örebro County.

Earlier in her life she was a member of the Livets Ord, the largest parish within the Swedish Word of Faith Movement and as her father was a pastor, she also attended Odenslundskyrkan, a local church of Equmeniakyrkan, whereas he served at the time she lived in Östersund. She has also been a member of the anti-abortion movement ‘Yes to Life’. When appointed, Prime Minister Fredrik Reinfeldt stressed that her previous religious choices had nothing to do with her new job.

References

External links
Elisabeth Svantesson at the Riksdag website

 

 

 

Living people
1967 births
Swedish Christians
Women members of the Riksdag
Örebro University alumni
Members of the Riksdag 2006–2010
Members of the Riksdag 2010–2014
Members of the Riksdag 2014–2018
Members of the Riksdag 2018–2022
Members of the Riksdag 2022–2026
21st-century Swedish politicians
21st-century Swedish women politicians
Members of the Riksdag from the Moderate Party
Women government ministers of Sweden
Female finance ministers